S4C (Sianel Pedwar Cymru, meaning Channel Four Wales) is a Welsh language free-to-air public broadcast television channel. Launched on 1 November 1982, it was the first television channel to be aimed specifically at a Welsh-speaking audience. S4C's headquarters are based in Carmarthen, at the University of Wales Trinity Saint David's creative and digital centre, Yr Egin. It also has regional offices in Caernarfon and Cardiff. As of 2019–20, S4C had an average of 101 employees. S4C is the fourth-oldest terrestrial television channel in Wales after BBC One, ITV and BBC Two.

As with Channel 4 (which launched the next day in the rest of the UK), S4C commissions all of its programmes from independent producers. BBC Cymru Wales produces programmes for S4C as part of its public service remit, including the news service Newyddion. From its launch until 2010, S4C also carried English-language programming acquired from Channel 4, which could not be received over-the-air in most of Wales; these programmes aired in non-peak hours, and did not always air in pattern with Channel 4's scheduling.

On digital terrestrial television, S4C has broadcast exclusively in Welsh since the platform's launch in 1998, with the existing bilingual schedule continuing on analogue television. After the completion of the digital switchover in Wales on 31 March 2010, Channel 4 became available on Freeview, and S4C ceased its carriage of English-language programmes. S4C offers translated, English-language subtitles for its Welsh programming.

Pre-launch
Before the launch of S4C on Monday 1 November 1982, Welsh speakers had been served by occasional programmes in Welsh, broadcast as regional opt-outs on BBC Cymru Wales and HTV Cymru Wales (the ITV franchise in Wales), usually at off-peak or inconvenient times. This was unsatisfactory for Welsh speakers, who saw the arrangement as a sop, and at the same time an annoyance for non-Welsh speakers, who found the English-language programmes seen in the rest of the UK often rescheduled or not transmitted at all.

On 14 September 1962, the ITV network had created a licence area for North and West Wales, which was awarded to Wales (West and North) Limited. This traded as Teledu Cymru and provided significant levels of Welsh-language programming. However, problems with transmission infrastructure and poor market research led to financial difficulties within two years, and after going bankrupt, the station was taken over by its neighbour Television Wales and the West.

During the 1970s, Welsh-language activists had campaigned for a television service in the language, which already had its own radio station, BBC Radio Cymru. Both the Conservative and Labour parties promised a Welsh-language fourth channel, if elected to government in the 1979 general election. Shortly after the Conservatives won a majority in the election, the new Home Secretary, William Whitelaw, decided against a Welsh fourth channel, and suggested that, except for an occasional opt-out, the service should be the same as that offered in the rest of the UK. This led to acts of civil disobedience, including refusals to pay the television licence fee, thereby running the risk of prosecution or even a prison sentence, and sit-ins in BBC and HTV studios. Some took more extreme measures, including attacking television transmitters in Welsh-speaking areas.

On 17 September 1980, the former president of Plaid Cymru, Gwynfor Evans, threatened to go on hunger strike if the Conservative government of Margaret Thatcher did not honour its commitment to provide a Welsh-language television service. S4C started broadcasting on 1 November 1982, broadcasting around 22 hours a week of programmes, mostly during prime time with a teatime slot for children with English language programmes from Channel 4, rescheduled to fit around the Welsh programmes.

Relocation

In September 2013, S4C began a study into the possible relocation of its headquarters. S4C’s former headquarters, which opened in 1991, were located at Parc Ty Glas Industrial Estate, Llanishen, following a move from Cathedral Road and Sophia Close in Pontcanna, Cardiff. In January 2013, a new multi-use media centre was opened on its Llanishen site. In March 2014, it was announced that Carmarthen was the winner with a bid led by the University of Wales Trinity Saint David. The university owns the land where the Canolfan S4C Yr Egin (S4C Yr Egin Centre) would be built. The building would also be home to other companies in the creative industries. There was a strong bid for relocation to Caernarfon, where the channel had a pre-existing office, but there was disappointment that the bid was unsuccessful. In 2016, it was revealed that S4C was paying £3 million upfront rent to UWTSD, and that it would pay rent over the next 20 years. Concern was expressed about the arrangement and the lack of transparency around commercial payments between two publicly funded bodies. The University of Wales Trinity Saint David applied for funding for the building work and received £3m from the Welsh Government and a further £3m from the Swansea Bay city deal.

In June 2018, it was revealed that more staff would be leaving the channel than moving to work in Carmarthen. S4C started relocating to the new building from September 2018, and 54 jobs moved to the new HQ. An office in Cardiff was retained for technical purposes until full changeover to the new BBC Wales Headquarters, with 70 staff there. A significant percentage of the technical posts were to transfer to the BBC. In September 2018, S4C committed to ten years of lease on its Caernarfon office at Doc Fictoria (Victoria Dock), which has 12 full-time staff, and was opened in 2008. In January 2021 S4C's Presentation, Library, Promotion and Commercial departments moved to BBC Wales headquarters in Central Square, Cardiff. The first programmes were broadcast from there 27 January 2021, beginning with the channel's children's service, Cyw, at 6:00 a.m. Liz Scourfield's first live presentation aired later that morning, before the news bulletin at 12:00.

Programming
S4C's remit is to provide a service which features a wide range of programmes in the Welsh language. Like Channel 4, S4C does not produce programmes of its own; instead, it commissions programmes from BBC Cymru Wales and independent producers (although the quantity purchased from ITV Cymru Wales has greatly reduced since the early years of S4C), and it has particularly developed a reputation for commissioning children's animation, such as SuperTed, Rocky Hollow, Fireman Sam (also broadcast by the BBC) Wil Cwac Cwac (shown on ITV), Gogs, Shakespeare: The Animated Tales, Animated Tales of the World and the 1992–1996 French co-production Natalie.

BBC Cymru Wales fulfils its public service requirement by producing programmes in Welsh, including Newyddion, S4C's news bulletin, and a soap opera, Pobol y Cwm, and providing them to S4C free of charge. It has also provided (or licensed) Welsh-language versions of English-language programmes, such as the original Teletubbies. On the analogue service, S4C showed programmes produced for Channel 4 in the rest of the United Kingdom – either simultaneously or time-shifted – outside of peak hours. These programmes were provided to S4C by Channel 4, free of charge.

To make content more accessible to English speakers, all Welsh-language programming carries English subtitles. Originally these were on Sbectel teletext page 888, with Welsh subtitles on page 889, with both subtitle languages now also available on digital television platforms. For speakers of English who are learning Welsh, certain programmes, particularly children's programmes Planed Plant Bach (now Cyw) and Planed Plant (now Stwnsh), carry subtitles featuring Welsh subtitles with additional English translations in brackets next to more difficult Welsh-language words. TV films produced for S4C have received some good foreign reviews; Hedd Wyn was nominated for the Best Foreign Language Oscar in 1994 and Solomon & Gaenor was nominated in 2000.

The S4C analogue signal also spilled over on to the east coast of Ireland. In the past it was rebroadcast in a number of areas there on UHF terrestrial signals by so-called 'deflectors'. Up until the 1990s, S4C was also carried by some Irish cable and MMDS providers before being replaced by Channel 4. The S4C channels continue to be available in the Republic of Ireland via the Freesat satellite service.

Up until 2009, S4C ran its own teletext service, Sbectel ("Sbec", Welsh for "a peek" or "a glimpse", and a reference to an S4C schedule insert formerly included in the TVTimes issues for the HTV Wales region).

Viewing figures
13.5 million people throughout the UK watched S4C on television at some time during 2020–2021. The number of people who watched S4C on TV every week throughout the UK increased from 702,000 in 2019–2020 to 823,000 in 2020–2021. On an average week in 2020–2021, approximately 321,000 people in Wales watched S4C on TV. 150,000 Welsh speakers in Wales watched S4C each week during this period. 20,200 was the average audience in the peak hours during 2020–2021.

The BARB rolling four-week viewing figures for January 2022 were 0.05% across the UK. If scaled up for Wales alone, this would be just a 1.0% audience share.

The programme that enjoyed the channel's highest viewing figures in 2019-2020 was Sgorios coverage of Wales' Euro 2020 qualifier match against Hungary in November 2019, which drew 366,000 viewers.

There were also 38.2 million viewing sessions of S4C content on Facebook, Twitter and YouTube in 2018–2019, with 8.6 million viewing sessions of S4C content on S4C Arlein and BBC iPlayer.

Digital channels
When digital terrestrial television launched in 1998, S4C added a second, full-time Welsh-language channel called S4C Digidol ('digital') on 1 November 1998. Following the switch-off of analogue terrestrial signals on 31 March 2010, Wales became the first fully digital region in the UK, with both S4C and Channel 4 becoming available to all homes. As a result, S4C now broadcasts solely in the Welsh language and, as well as on Freeview in Wales, is available throughout Britain, Ireland and the rest of western Europe on Freesat and Sky. A review commissioned by the Department for Culture, Media and Sport in 2004 suggested that "S4C should operate a single core service after digital switchover".

In addition, S4C also operated a sister channel, S4C2 (S4C Dau) until 2010. It formerly broadcast coverage of the National Assembly for Wales when in session. The programme content was provided by the BBC who, from January 2010, now make it available online and via BBC Parliament. Like the main channel, S4C2 was available within Wales on Freeview and throughout the UK and Ireland on Freesat and Sky. S4C2 had two audio feeds, allowing viewers to select between an untranslated version and an English-only version where all Welsh spoken is translated into English. Delayed coverage of Assembly proceedings is now broadcast overnight on S4C's main channel on Tuesdays, Wednesdays and Thursdays. In addition to the analogue TV signal transmitted throughout Wales, S4C, along with United News & Media, owned the company S4C Digital Networks (SDN). SDN was awarded the UK-wide contract to provide half a digital multiplex worth of programming. The other half continues to belong to the broadcaster Channel 5.

On 27 April 2005, S4C sold its share of SDN to ITV plc for approximately £34 million, though it still has the half-multiplex as of right in Wales. ITV already owned some of SDN due to the consolidation of the ITV industry: Granada bought UNM's stake in SDN, and this was then incorporated into the united ITV plc. In January 2007, S4C announced plans to launch a Welsh-language children's service. The new service, in the form of a programming block, launched on 23 June 2008. Under the name Cyw (chick), it brings together a wide range of programmes for nursery-age children, and S4C plans eventually to extend the service to include the Stwnsh strand for older children and a third service for teenagers and young people. The service currently airs on weekdays from 7 am to 1.30 pm on S4C.

S4C launched a high-definition simulcast of S4C called 'Clirlun' on 19 July 2010 to coincide with terrestrial digital switchover in Wales. Clirlun was broadcast on Freeview channel 53 only, and not via other platforms. However, following funding cuts and a review of core services it was announced on 11 July 2012 that Clirlun would close before the end of the year. Clirlun closed at midnight on the evening of 1 December 2012, with Channel 4 HD taking over its transmission capacity with effect from the next day, 2 December 2012.

It was announced on 20 May 2016 that S4C would relaunch a high-definition service S4C HD on Freesat and Sky in Wales and across the UK from 7 June onwards. Following the 2016 relaunch of S4C HD, the channel returned to Freeview in HD from 7pm on Wednesday 19 January 2022. It will broadcast for peak viewing hours only, from 7pm on weekday evenings and from 2pm on weekends, sharing capacity with the HD version of the BBC's children's service CBBC.

In December 2014, S4C became available on the BBC iPlayer website, both live and on demand, initially as part of an 18-month trial.

Presentation

1982–1987

S4C launched on 1 November 1982 (the day before Channel 4 started in England, Scotland and Northern Ireland), its on-air appearance has always been a representation of the Welsh society and people, but this representation has changed several times. Initial idents featured clips from the natural landscapes of Wales with a basic logo animation and a synthesizer fanfare, with the logo forming as WALES4CYMRU.

1987–1993

On 2 May 1987, the ident changed to a computer-generated ident featuring an animation of the streamlined S4C logo and the colours of the logo were blue, green and red. The font used for this logo was Bodoni MT Bold. On 7 September 1990, the new ident was introduced, depicting a piece of Welsh slate with colours blue, green and red washing over the letters S4C until 31 May 1993.

1993–2007

On 1 June 1993, S4C introduced a new series of idents, which depicted inanimate objects as having characteristics of dragons (such as flight or breathing fire), as a reference to the red dragon on the flag of Wales. On 10 February 1995, the channel introduced a new logo (in the Futura typeface) replaces the original serif logo, featuring a tilde representing a dragon with a flame next to the "C" as if were breathing fire. The idents were designed, created and directed by Charlotte Castle, Brian Eley and Martin Lambie-Nairn.

Inanimate objects in the regular idents contained a dragon made of flags, a kite, an oxy-acetylene, a pair of scissors, a shepherd dragon man, a sousaphone, a standpipe, an extinguisher, an iron, a pencil, a flashlight, a pedal bin, a fan, a sport screen, a spray can, a vacuum cleaner, a stapler, a computer mouse, a garlic crusher, a lawnmower, a magic hat, a shower, an egg cup and a loudspeaker.

Regular idents
Many variants were made over the course during its 13-year existence (such as the shots, angles and music) until the dragon idents were withdrawn on 31 December 2006:
 Dragon Standard: On different angles, fire is spreading around some sticks (with flags); the screen then proceeds to show the whole object, which is a floating red standard in the shape of a dragon made of flags. It was used for the S4C Video Classics ident from 1993 to 1997.
 Oxy-acetylene: The upper part of an oxy-acetylene rotates and then blows fire. The screen then shows the entire object. A mirrored version was also produced.
 Dragon Man: A man dressed as a dragon with his shepherd staff with a dragon's tail as a hook in a mountainous region blows fire.
 Scissors: A pair of red scissors open up and blow yellow and orange pieces of fabric to represent fire. A short version had a closer view of the scissor's blades, which has smoke coming from it.
 Kite: A kite made to look like a dragon floats around in the sky. 
 Clockwork Dragon: On a grey background, a 3D mechanism countdown clock with bouncing red balls shows red pieces of a dragon scattered in loop in 10 minutes or 40 seconds and in last few frames, it reveals a red dragon. It was used for schools programming until June 1999. Welsh and English versions were made.
 Sousaphone: A camera pans around a brass sousaphone, which blows fire. A short version had the entire view of a sousaphone blowing fire, over a table. 
 Standpipe: A standpipe that looks like an old-fashioned water pump is turned on and emits fire.
 Extinguisher: A sentient fire extinguisher sees a flame and proceeds to put it out. A short version had a closer view of the extinguisher's pressure gauge, which is constantly moving.
 Iron: A red clothes iron moves forwards and then backwards on the red cloth over a table, which makes steam.
 Pencil: A red pencil draws (forming fire) around the floor. Then, the screen shows a close view of the pencil. A short version had a fire version.
 Curly Light: A red flashlight, attached with a long red pipe wire around the pole turns on and moves around the screen.
 Pedal Bin: A pile of rubbish falls into a red pedal bin, which eventually blows fire.
 Fan: A fan is located near an open window on a room, working. Eventually, it blows fire rather than wind. A short version was also produced.
 Spray Can: A spray can sprays red graffiti around the rusty brown background.
 Vacuum Cleaner: A red vacuum cleaner is seen performing on the stage.
 Screen: A big red countdown sport screen shows fire in the end. It was used for sports programming until October 2004.
 Tiled Carousel: A picture of a Welsh landscape moves with the square pieces of puzzle of a dragon and a landscape inside and out until the last few frames, the pieces reveal a brown Welsh dragon. Two versions were made, one in coloured version until June 2000 and the monochrome version in September 2000 onwards. It was used for schools programming.
 Stapler: A red stapler gets the red ribbon and sways it at the end.
 Mouse: A computer mouse moves around and pulls the connector out at the end. A special preview screen was also produced.
 Garlic Crusher: A chili pepper falls onto the garlic crusher, which blows fire.
 Lawnmower: A lawnmower is seen cutting the grass, setting sparks out and running around in the end with black smoke.
 Shower: A bathroom door opens (with the S4C logo and the web address turning red) and a bathroom curtain reveals a red shower head, which blows fire.
 Magic Hat: A magic top hat blows fire and pours little red hearts out. A special St. David's Day version was also produced with daffodils.
 Egg Cup: Three eggs are seen in the row, one of them in between cracks and blows fire. A short version with two eggs removed was also produced.
 Loudspeaker: A loudspeaker is seen dancing and blowing fire in the end.
 Special idents were the Christmas idents, Saint David's Day idents, a kangaroo dragon flag ident for the 2003 Rugby World Cup, Mawr (also the ITV ident in 2004), Cofio 60, Eisteddfod idents and the Big Brother 7 final.
 The new sports ident named Chwaraeon S4C Sport replaced the countdown screen in October 2004.
 From 1–16 January 2007, temporary idents were used which gave a nod towards what was to come for the new presentation on the station, and it was called 'A new direction'. The 1995 logo was withdrawn on 17 January 2007.
 The clock idents changed in 1993, 1995 (the same clock from 1993, with the new logo), 1999, 2000, 2002, 2005 and 2006 (this was the last logo to include the clock ident). There were also Christmas versions for the clock idents.
 In 2012 (during the channel's 30th anniversary), two idents were revived (the Dragon Standard and Stapler variants). These idents, again, were adapted to widescreen and used the same special logo previously mentioned.

Christmas idents
 1993: A toy dragon looks around, inside a greenish snow globe with a tree and some presents. The background is slightly brownish.
 1994: A Welsh dragon dressed as Father Christmas comes down the chimney with a sack full of toys, leaves the footprints across the living room where the toys come to life and enters the doorway to the bedroom.
 1995: A Christmas themed-kaleidoscope includes an angel, a present, a cracker, a snowflake, a candle and a ribbon.
 1996: Same as 1995, with Father Christmas in the promos. 
 1997: A house contains a family of parents and their children. The children run downstairs to open their presents in one ident and their parents kiss under the mistletoe in the other.
 1998: Several close views of green leaves are shown, from either a holly or a mistletoe. The background is more orange than red.
 1999: The children play the Nativity with the baby as baby Jesus.
 2000: An animated yellow star blows fire. The background is red with yellow stars and a yellow moon.
 2001: A red S4C lorry covered with lights (similar to the Coca-Cola Christmas lorry) travels at night as the S4C's Magical Grotto.
 2002: Same as 1998.
 2003: On a red background, there are white Christmas themed symbols such as the star, mistletoe, French horn, angle, Christmas tree and two new year symbols including a man dancing and a glass of wine.
 2004: A bunch of blue and light blue pieces are moving and re-ordering to form a tree, with a yellow glow resembling a star. The background is white.
 2005: A red/white light glow moves to the right side of the screen, on a dark background. Live-action idents were also produced featuring Welsh actors interpreting Nativity scenes.
 2006: A pile of 19 sets of televisions of pre-2007 idents shows a Christmas tree in different angles on different televisions screens. Daytime, evening and nighttime versions were made. This was the last S4C Christmas ident to use a 1995 logo.

2007–2014

On 18 January 2007, S4C announced that their digital channels would be refreshed with a new corporate logo and brand. The new branding was implemented online on 17 January, with S4C's television channels adopting it the next day. The new branding, developed by the London-based firm Proud Creative, was intended to portray S4C as a more "contemporary" multi-platform broadcaster, and downplayed "traditional" Welsh imagery such as dragons. Its idents were filmed around various parts of the country, and themed around magnetism—representing the "uncontrollable attraction" of Welsh people and their "emotional affinity to the homeland, whether near or far". The magnetism-themed idents were later accompanied by a new set developed in collaboration with the agency Minivegas, consisting of live-action scenes with dynamic, animated elements that can react to the voice of the continuity announcer.

2014–present
A new S4C logo and brand developed by Sugar Creative Studio was introduced on 10 April 2014; the new design was developed around a concept of providing "context" to S4C's target audience and programming. The design revolves heavily around a trapezium shape used within the channel's new logo, which is prominently used within aspects of the channel's overall marketing and branding.

Criticisms
S4C has faced criticism for poor viewing figures since its launch. Leaked internal reports in March 2010 showed that 'over the 20-day period from February 15 to last Saturday, March 6, as many as 196 of the 890 programmes put out by S4C were rated as having zero viewers'. The story was widely reported across the UK and was referenced in Parliament by the then Culture Secretary, Jeremy Hunt. In response, an S4C spokesperson stated that 90% of those programmes were aimed at pre-school children, and that BARB (the organisation that compiles television ratings in the UK) only takes into account viewers aged four years and over. The remaining 10% consisted of repeats and daytime news bulletins which did not attract the minimum 1,000 viewers necessary to register on a UK-wide analysis.

On 28 July 2010, S4C's chief executive, Iona Jones, left her post without explanation. Assembly members and Members of Parliament requested an independent investigation into the circumstances leading up to her departure. The S4C Authority refused to comment further and commissioned a review into how the broadcaster was governed in August 2010. On 3 February 2011, it was announced that issues between Iona Jones and S4C had been settled. Eight days later, the Shortridge Report on corporate governance was made public.

Personnel
S4C appointed its first female CEO, Iona Jones, in 2005.

Owen Evans, previously the deputy permanent secretary to the Welsh Government, became chief executive in October 2017. Siân Doyle, a former managing director of telecommunications company TalkTalk, succeeded Evans as CEO on 1 January 2022.

Funding and regulation
From its inception, S4C was in part publicly financed: funding came both from its advertising revenue and a fixed annual grant from the UK Department for Digital, Culture, Media and Sport (DCMS), receiving £102m in 2010 and then £90m in 2011 after the Conservative Party won the general elections in 2010 which consequently made considerable cuts to its funding. Additionally, some Welsh-language programming (including Newyddion and Pobol y Cwm) was produced by BBC Wales as part of the BBC's public service remit, and provided to S4C free of charge. There is an agreement in place until 2022 for 10 hours a week of programming to be provided to S4C, which is valued at £19.4m annually.

From 2013, responsibility for funding S4C began to transfer to the BBC, with the DCMS reducing its funding by 94% by 2015. The BBC was to provide around £76m of funding to S4C by this date, resulting in a cut of around 25% to S4C's annual budget. In 2016, it was agreed that the BBC would provide £74.5m a year funding to S4C from the licence fee until 2022. The UK government announced in 2018 that it would continue providing £6.72m until 2020, with the aim of S4C being funded wholly from the licence fee from 2022. This would see S4C's funding being decided as part of the licence fee settlement, for 10-year periods.

Prior to 2011, S4C received ~£102m (which would be an estimate of ~£122.8m in January 2022 after inflation), with the new allocated funds of 2022 (which is £82m), the loss in 2022 alone compared with 2010 is estimated to be ~£40.8m and an overall loss of ~£450m between 2011 and 2022.

In addition to public funding, S4C generates around 2% of its income through commercial sources, such as advertising.

S4C is controlled by the S4C Authority (Awdurdod S4C), an independent body unconnected to Ofcom. Ofcom are the regulator for S4C's content, as they are with other UK television channels such as ITV and Channel 4.

Catch-up service

S4C maintains its own catch-up service called Clic. Clic is a free online video on demand service which offers live-streaming, signed programming, a 35-day catch-up service, and archive programming. Clic is available across the UK but also contains a limited selection of worldwide programming. Clic's catch-up service is split into seven categories: Drama, Entertainment, Factual and Arts, Music, Sport, and two Children's categories,  Cyw (ages 3–6) and Stwnsh (ages 7–13). A Clic app was released for Apple's iOS devices on 18 August 2011.

In late 2014, S4C's programmes and live-streaming also became available to view on the BBC's catch-up service, BBC iPlayer. Both services offer English and Welsh subtitles to some shows.

There were 8.2 million viewing sessions to S4C content on Clic and BBC iPlayer in 2017–2018. This was an increase of 600,000 from the 7.6 million viewing sessions on those platforms in 2016–2017. In the 2020–2021 period, the viewing session number increased to 11 million.

See also
 Fourth UK television service
 Timeline of television in Wales
 Timeline of S4C
 List of Welsh-language programmes
 List of Welsh-language media
 Celtic Media Festival

Notes

References

External links

 Cyw children's channel
 Learners' site
 S4C 2007 Annual Report - audience share
 S4C Authority: official website

 
Television channels in the United Kingdom
Welsh language
Television in minority languages
Television channels and stations established in 1982
Companies based in Cardiff
Television in Wales
1982 establishments in Wales
Department for Digital, Culture, Media and Sport